"Wings to Fly" is a single by Dutch three-piece girl group O'G3NE. The song was released in the Netherlands as a digital download on 10 July 2015 through 8ball Music. The song peaked at number 100 on the Dutch Singles Chart.

Track listing

Chart performance

Weekly charts

Release history

References

2015 songs
2015 singles
O'G3NE songs